Will Hobbs (born 1947) is the American author of twenty novels for upper elementary, middle school and young adult readers, as well as two picture book stories. Hobbs credits his sense of audience to his fourteen years of teaching reading and English in southwest Colorado. When he turned to writing, he set his stories mostly in wild places he knew from firsthand experience. Hobbs has said he wants to “take young people into the outdoors and engage their sense of wonder.” Bearstone, his second novel, gained national attention when it took the place of Where the Red Fern Grows as the unabridged novel in Prentice-Hall’s 7th grade literature anthology. Downriver and Far North were selected by the American Library Association for its list of the 100 Best Young Adult Books of the 20th century. As of 2020, all twenty-two of Hobbs’ books are in print, and all the novels are available in unabridged audio editions.

Biography
William Carl Hobbs grew up in an Air Force family and was raised in Panama, Virginia, Alaska, northern California, southern California, and Texas. He was the middle child of five born to Mary Ann (Rhodes) Hobbs and Gregory J. Hobbs. “During the years we were living in Alaska,” Hobbs has written, “I fell in love with mountains, rivers, fishing, baseball, and books.” In 1969 Will Hobbs graduated from Stanford University with a B.A. in English. His M.A. in English from Stanford followed in 1971. He and his wife, Jean, were married in December 1972. Drawn by the San Juan Mountains to southwestern Colorado, they found teaching jobs in Pagosa Springs. After four years they resettled in the Durango area, where Hobbs taught for ten years at Miller Junior High. Summers he devoted to writing, backpacking, and rowing his whitewater raft through the canyons of the Southwest. Hobbs rowed ten trips down the Grand Canyon. In 1990 he began writing full-time. His professional travels have taken him to 47 states, Canada, and Germany, where six of his novels have been published in the German language. Other foreign editions have appeared in Sweden, the Czech Republic, Italy, the Netherlands, and the U.K.

Works
 Changes in Latitudes (1988)
 Bearstone (1989)
 Downriver (1991) 
 The Big Wander (1992)
 Beardance (1993)
 Kokopelli's Flute (1995) 
 Far North (1996) 
 Beardream (1997, illustrated by Jill Kastner)
 Ghost Canoe (1997)
 River Thunder (1997)
 The Maze (1998)
 Howling Hill (1998, illustrated by Jill Kastner)
 Jason's Gold (1999)
 Down the Yukon (2001)
 Wild Man Island (2002)
 Jackie's Wild Seattle (2003) 
 Leaving Protection (2004)
 Crossing The Wire (2006)
 Go Big or Go Home (2008) 
 Take Me to the River (2011)
 Never Say Die (2013)
 City of Gold (2020)

Awards
 1990 Mountains and Plains Booksellers Regional Book Award Winner for Bearstone
 1992 Colorado Blue Spruce Young Adult Book Award Winner for Changes in Latitudes 
 1993 Colorado Book Award Winner for Beardance
 1993 Spur Award Winner, Western Writers of America for Beardance
 1995 California Young Reader Medal Winner for Downriver
 1996 Spur Award Winner, Western Writers of America for Far North
 1997-98 Colorado Blue Spruce Young Adult Book Award Winner for Downriver
 1997 Colorado Book Award Winner for Far North
 1998 Colorado Book Award Winner for Beardream, illustrated by Jill Kastner
 1998 Edgar Allan Poe Award, Best Young Adult Mystery for Ghost Canoe 
 1998 Colorado Book Award Winner for Ghost Canoe
 2002 Land of Enchantment Book Award Winner (NM) for Ghost Canoe
 2006 Wyoming Paintbrush Award Winner for Down the Yukon
 2007 Southwest Book Award Winner for Crossing the Wire
 2008 Heartland Award Winner (KS) for Crossing the Wire
 2009 Mountains and Plains Booksellers Regional Book Award Winner for Go Big or Go Home

Lifetime/Body of Work Awards
 1998 Thomas Hornsby Ferril Lifetime Literary Achievement Award (CO)
 1999 Arizona Author Award, Arizona Library Association
 2001 Frank Waters Award, Pikes Peak Library (CO)

External links

 VOYA "Looking Back, Looking Ahead with Author Will Hobbs"
 Mackin Community "A Big Win-Win"
 The Horn Book "Five Questions for Will Hobbs" 
 Guys Write for Guys Read: Boys' Favorite Authors Write about Being Boys
 Bookrags.com "Will Hobbs Biography"
 Discover Author Will Hobbs on HarperCollins Publishers
 The Alan Review "An Interview with Will Hobbs: How His Novels Come into Being"
 TeachingBooks.net

Author video
 Tim Podell interviews Will Hobbs for Good Conversations

1947 births
American adventure novelists
American children's writers
American young adult novelists
20th-century American novelists
21st-century American novelists
American male novelists
Living people
Edgar Award winners
20th-century American male writers
21st-century American male writers